John Mark Pettigrew (born October 1968) is a British businessman, the CEO of National Grid plc.

Early life
John Mark Pettigrew was born in October 1968 in Pontypridd, Wales. His father was John Pettigrew and his mother, Patricia.

Pettigrew graduated from Cardiff University, where he earned a bachelor of science in economics and a master's degree in international economics and banking.

Career
Pettigrew joined National Grid as a graduate in 1991. He joined the board in April 2014.

In November 2015, it was announced that Steve Holliday, the CEO for ten years, would leave in March 2016, and that Pettigrew, its UK executive director who joined National Grid 25 years ago, would succeed him.

Personal life
Pettigrew married Lesley Davies in 1996. They have two daughters.

References

Living people
1968 births
British chief executives in the energy industry
People from Pontypridd
Alumni of Cardiff University
Welsh chief executives